Gay Ruby Hartwig (born February 2, 1943, also professionally credited as Gay Hartwig, Gay Autterson and Gay Autterson Hartwig) is an American voice actress who has done voice-overs for animated television series by Hanna-Barbera. She is mostly known as the voice of Betty Rubble for several of The Flintstones spin-off series and specials throughout the 1970s and early 1980s such as The Pebbles and Bamm-Bamm Show, The Flintstone Comedy Hour, The New Fred and Barney Show and The Flintstone Comedy Show.

Filmography

References

External links

1943 births
Living people
American voice actresses
Actresses from Texas
People from Caldwell County, Texas
20th-century American actresses
Hanna-Barbera people
21st-century American women